Emily Stellato (born 31 May 1982) is an Italian former professional tennis player and professional padel player.

A right-handed player from Latina, Stellato reached a best singles ranking of 364 on the professional tour and won two ITF titles.

Stellato was ranked as high as 162 in doubles and won a WTA Tour title at Palermo in 2003, partnering Adriana Serra Zanetti. She won a further seven ITF doubles tournaments, all in partnership with Alice Canepa.

WTA Tour finals

Doubles (1-0)

ITF finals

Singles: 5 (2–3)

Doubles: 12 (7–5)

References

External links
 
 

1982 births
Living people
Italian female tennis players
Female tennis players playing padel
Sportspeople from the Province of Latina